ORG-26576 is an ampakine originally developed by Cortex Pharmaceuticals and then licensed to Organon International for development. In animal studies it has been shown to effectively potentiate AMPA receptor function, leading to increased BDNF release and enhanced neuronal differentiation and survival, as well as producing nootropic effects in standardised assays. Development as an antidepressant has been halted due to a failed Phase II trial for major depressive disorder.

See also 
 AMPA receptor positive allosteric modulator

References 

Ampakines
AMPA receptor positive allosteric modulators
Experimental drugs